Paulus Henrique Benedictus Cox (16 April 194018 June 2016), known as Paul Cox, was a Dutch-Australian filmmaker who has been recognized as "Australia's most prolific film auteur".

Background
Cox was born to Else (née Kuminack), a German, and father Wim Cox, on 16 April 1940, in Venlo, Limburg, the Netherlands, after his brother (also named Wim) and sister Elizabeth, and was the eldest of sisters Jacoba, Angeline and Christa.

Father, Wim Cox 
A documentary film producer and son of the publisher of the Catholic newspaper Nieuwe Venlosche Courant, Cox senior in 1933 launched the lavishly illustrated, but ultimately unsuccessful, film magazine Zuiderfilm, and in 1935 proposed to build a cinema at the newspaper's office. He was commissioned in 1938 by Van Meegeren, the chairman of the 'RK Bond voor Groote Families' (Catholic Association for Large Families) founded in 1917 by Mathijs Janssen, to make the film Levensgang ('The Journey of Life'.)

Wim Cox had made shorts before, but this was his first major film. Using 16 mm film and a self-designed sound system, he recorded the daily life of a large Catholic family in Venlo. Film critic Janus van Domburg (1895–1983) praised Levensgang as the Netherlands best 16mm film to date. The Tegelse Courant wrote: '...this film projects a beam of light on the path of life'. The non-Catholic Algemeen Handelsblad agreed: "[Cox] has managed to capture scenes of joy and sadness, moments of emotion and contemplation on film. All is edited into a fascinating and flowing whole, with strong cinematic rhythms that speak a clear language." Between its premiere on October 12, 1938, until 1940 the film was seen by 25,000. Paul Cox discovered only much later that his father had been a filmmaker who made documentaries in the Netherlands, Belgium and Germany before the Second World War. Paul Cox is recorded as saying that though his father's film was 'dreadful propoaganda' and terribly outdated,' he admired it as "real cinema. The whole concept of it was very meticulously researched, you can see that in the storyboarding of every shot. It's quite a remarkable piece of work. This is, in a way, a better propaganda film than anything Leni Riefenstahl ever did.'

Brother, Wim Cox 
Cox's older brother Wim, born 1938, after learning from assisting his father also made a career in film and photography. He studied at the Nederlansche Fotofakschool 1958-61, moved to Cologne to work in the Lambertin photo studio at the Hohenzollern Bridge and from 1971 was self-employed, taking over the Cologne photo workshop Schmölz & Ulrich. He was Board member of the Cologne Photographic Guild, chairman of the journeyman's examination board and member of the German Society for Photography. The brothers in 1997 co-wrote the book Ich Bin ('I Am').

Flight 
Just after his birth Cox and his family were forced to flee their border town home during the German invasion of Holland in April and May 1940, experiencing traumatic events during the rest of the war which Cox felt were formative. Postwar accusations that Wim Cox's grandfather in his publication Nieuwe Venlosche Courant had cooperated with the Germans brought repercussions on his family, including the seizure of all filmmaking equipment, cutting short Cox's father's career. That was the cause of much bitterness, though in 1957 he was able to make a feature film Reden tot leven ('Reason for Living'). He set up as a portrait photographer, recruiting daughter Elizabeth, and later, most of the rest of the family, to assist in the darkroom.

Early photography 
Cox was conscripted into the army at nineteen, was injured in training and subsequently, against his father's wishes, studied art in evening school. He used an old camera from his father's studio to take his earliest successful photographs on a trip to Paris with his mother, one of which appears on the cover of his autobiography.

Emigration
Cox emigrated to Australia as a tertiary-level exchange student in 1963, by which time he had already established himself as a photographer. Although his destination was Sydney, he was put ashore in Melbourne. There he enrolled at the University of Melbourne to study history and English literature for an Arts degree', taking part-time jobs as a camera retailer and events photographer, but in eighteen months left after a love affair interrupted his studies. He traveled back to Holland on a French cargo ship via South Pacific, South America, and back home held two exhibitions of the resultant photographs.

Photographer 
He determined to return to Australia and in 1965 he migrated. He first worked in the camera department in Myer department store and saved enough to start a small photography studio producing portraits and commercial assignments in a rented shop and dwelling at 344 Punt Road, South Yarra, in the 'Sharp's Buildings' terrace. There, he held further exhibitions and was commissioned by The Australian Ballet as stills photographer on Robert Helpmann's and Rudoph Nureyev's Don Quixote, through which he met Hungarian actor and filmmaker Tibor Markus who was to produce Cox's first feature Illuminations.

In the late 1960s Cox travelled to Papua New Guinea with Ulli Beier whose interest was indigenous poetry, drama and creative writing. In the resulting 1971 book Cox's photographs of village life were set to poems written by Beier's students. Beier and Cox later published a book on Mirka Mora Also in 1971, Cox won a trip to London in the "Age of Aquarius" contest for professional photographers organised by Ilford (Australia) Pty. Ltd.

Lecturer in film 
Cox was appointed as a teacher of photography at Prahran College of Advanced Education in 1969, and with little experience in the medium, apart from making short Super 8 movies with friend Bernie Eddy, he went on to become the lecturer in cinematography, an experience he recalls in his autobiography as formative:

Apart from the few Super-8 movies I had made and some more serious attempts on 16mm, I knew nothing about filmmaking. I was forced to stay one step ahead of the students. That's how I became a filmmaker.

The film course received some $15,000 funding in August 1970 (a value of $180,000 in 2019) with which Head of the Art School Ted Worsley purchased cine cameras, a Steenbeck editing suite, film processor and Nagra tape deck. Always working with small budgets, Cox used the equipment in making The Journey (1972) and Illuminations (1975), with Prahran drama lecturer Alan Money on the cast, and in 1994 featured 43 paintings by colleague Eleanor Hart in Touch Me. Students were recruited, both as practical education for them and as a saving for the budding director, to serve as the film crews on Cox's Mirka (1970), and documentaries All Set Backstage (1974), We Are All Alone My Dear (1975), and For a Child Called Michael (1980). We Are All Alone My Dear, a portrait of novelist Jean Campbell in a home for the elderly, was made with $1,000 and brought Cox his first breakthrough, with an award for documentary film.

Cox turned his unneeded photography studio over to The Photographers' Gallery and Workshop which he founded with Ingeborg Tyssen, John F. Williams and Rod McNicoll in 1973. He remained at Prahran College until 1980 and with Athol Shmith and John Cato influenced a number of photographers and filmmakers, including artist Bill Henson, photojournalists Phil Quirk and Andrew Chapman, and Carol Jerrems, one of whose earliest exhibitions he showed in the Gallery.

Filmmaker 
Cox's Kostas (1979) about a Greek taxi driver Melbourne in a stormy love affair with an Australian woman played by Wendy Hughes, was more successful in Europe than in Australia. At first no one was interested in Cox's first film script for Lonely Hearts, but Philip Adams felt it was promising and introduced Cox to the writer John Clarke. Acted by Wendy Hughes and Norman Kaye, it was declared the best film of 1982 and received enthusiastic response at film festivals in London, New Delhi and San Francisco. Its success brought the attention and financial support for Cox's production of a rapid series of feature films.

Cox maintained his loyalty to screenwriters including John Clarke and Bob Ellis and to certain actors. His film-essay The Remarkable Mr. Kaye (2005) is a portrait of his ill friend, the actor Norman Kaye, who appeared in numerous Cox films, such as Lonely Hearts (1982) and Man of Flowers (1983).

In 2006 Cox became the Patron of the Byron Bay Film Festival.

On 26 December 2009 Cox received a liver transplant. David Bradbury's 2012 documentary, On Borrowed Time, tells this story against the backdrop of his life and work, through interviews with Cox and his friends and colleagues.  Cox has also written a memoir, Tales from the Cancer Ward.  Rosie Igusti, a fellow transplant recipient he met there, later became his partner.

Cox's last film Force of Destiny, with David Wenham and Indian actress Shahana Goswami, was released in July 2015. Wenham plays a sculptor and transplant patient who falls in love with a patient he meets in the hospital ward. Cox attended the American premier of Force of Destiny at the Ebertfest Film Festival in Chicago, having travelled with Rosie via stops in Bangkok, Dubai, and Frankfurt in order to avert the effects of travel on their delicate health. On 18 June 2016, he died at the age of 76.

Actor
Cox appeared in small parts, some uncredited, in several films including: as a photographer in Apostasy (1979) and Where the Green Ants Dream (1984), a mortician in To Market to Market (1987), as a New Age customer in his own Lust and Revenge (1996), and the shorts The Liver and To Music (both 2013). He appeared as himself in Peter Watkin's The Media Project.

Critical response 
John Larkin, in his introduction to Tales from the cancer ward writes that "Cox could have gone the Hollywood way. But he has kept his distance from producers, whom he considers predatory as they dominate the industry. He is very critical of what he sees as their betrayal of a once great art, cinema, into a crude kind of consumer culture. He has fought hard to stay independent, choosing to make films about people's inner lives, rather than the ephemeral world in which appearance is everything: the great glamour, the great illusion. His company is called Illumination Films. The Cox collection has longevity. His major films [will] continue to feature overseas and in Australia."

Actor on several Cox films David Wenham considers that; "There is no one like Cox. He is unique, and we need him, and people like him. I watched Molokai a little while ago: it's unmistakably a Paul Cox film. He is completely an auteur, because everything you see on the screen, and hear, has got Paul's fingerprints all over it. Ninety per cent of his take on the world, I would agree with."

Victoria Duckett, in evaluating the references to a painting by Titian in Cox's Man of Flowers, and evoking Cox's migrating to Australia by sea, sees a European Romanticism at work: "From this perspective, Cox’s Romanticism is uniquely Australian. By putting himself into the picture and putting the sea back into the frame, he explains our physical and metaphysical place in the world."

In a contrary view typical of much Australian criticism of Cox, Vikki Riley in a 1995 Filmnews condemns such "Europhile fetishes with lost connections and individuals' fragmented and uprooted lives - where the act of remembrance is a Proustian sensory pulse which unveils a seemingly bottomless pit of an inner narrative world driven by languid melancholia, inevitable destiny, missed opportunities and the heavy clouds of war," as precisely "the sorts of passions avoided by Australian filmmakers, save for the whining cultural cringe expressed in the works of Paul Cox, Ian Pringle, et al."

Publications 
 Cox, W., & Cox, P. (1997). Ich bin. Pulheim/Köln: Schuffelen
 Autobiography Reflections: An Autobiographical Journey in 1998.

Photography books 
 Cox, Paul (1970).  Human Still Lives from Nepal. s.n. (Mentone, Vic.: Alexander Bros.)
 Cox, Paul, & Ulli Beier (1971).  Home of Man: The People of New Guinea. Melbourne: Thomas Nelson (Australia) 
 Beier, Ulli, & Paul Cox (1980).  Mirka. South Melbourne, Victoria: Macmillan.

Exhibitions 
 1977 Australian Centre for Photography, Sydney: Photography by Athol Shmith and Paul Cox
 2009 Charles Nodrum Gallery, Melbourne: Paul Cox, 6 – 29 August
 2011 Mars Gallery, Melbourne: Paul Cox
 2011 Monash Gallery of Art: Age of Aquarius: Photography of Paul Cox, 7 April – 19 June

Filmography

Features
Illuminations (1976)
Inside Looking Out (1977)
Kostas (1979)
Lonely Hearts (1982)
Man of Flowers (1983)
My First Wife (1984)
Cactus (1986)
Island (1989)
Golden Braid (1990)
A Woman's Tale (1991)
The Nun and the Bandit (1992)
Exile (1994)
Lust and Revenge (1996)
Molokai: The Story of Father Damien (1999)
Innocence (2000)
The Diaries of Vaslav Nijinsky (2001)
Human Touch (2004)
Salvation (2008)
Force Of Destiny (2015)

Shorts
 Matuta: An Early Morning Fantasy (1965) – 23 min colour film
Time Past (1966) – 10 min b/w film
 The Prince Henry's Medical Team in Vietnam (1966) – 14 min colour film
 The Prince Henry's Story (1968) – 17 min b/w film
Skindeep (1968) – 40 min drama colour 16 mm film
Marcel (1969) – 7 min b/w 16 mm film
Symphony (1969) – 12 mins film
Mirka (1970) – 20 mins film
Phyllis (1971) – 35 mins colour 16 mm film
The Journey (1972) – 60 mins drama film
The Island (1975) – 10 min colour 16 mm film
Ways of Seeing (1977) – 24 min film
Ritual (1978) – 10 min film

Documentaries
Calcutta (1971) – 30 mins 
All Set Backstage (1974) – 22 mins 
We Are All Alone My Dear (1975) – 22 mins
For a Child Called Michael (1979) – 30 mins
The Kingdom of Nek Chand (1980) – 22 mins
Underdog (1980) – 53 mins
Death and Destiny (1984)
Vincent (1987)
The Hidden Dimension (1997) – 43 mins IMAX film
The Remarkable Mr. Kaye (2005)
Kaluapapa Heavan (2007)
The Dinner Party (2012)

TV
Paper Boy (1985) (TV)
Handle With Care (1985)
The Secret Life of Trees (1986) – 25 min TV film
The Gift (1988)
Touch Me (1993) – 30 min TV episode

Awards

1971 Winner 'Age of Aquarius' Ilford Photography Award
1982 Australian Film Institute - National Film Awards - Lonely Hearts - Best Film
1984 Valladolid International Film Festival – Golden Spike: Man of Flowers
1984 AFI Award – Best Director & Best Screenplay: My First Wife
1986 Flanders International Film Festival – Golden Spur: My First Wife
1991 Human Rights and Equal Opportunity Commission Feature Film Award for A Women's Tale
1992 Flanders International Film Festival – Golden Spur: A Woman's Tale
1993 Brisbane International Film Festival – Chauvel Award: for distinguished contribution to Australian Cinema
1994 44th Berlin International Film Festival – Golden Bear (nominated): Exile
2000 Taormina International Film Festival – FIPRESCI Prize: Innocence
2000 Montréal World Film Festival – Grand Prix des Amériques: Innocence
2000 IF Awards – Best Feature Film: Innocence
2003 Montréal International Festival of Films on Art – Jury Prize: The Diaries of Vaslav Nijinsky
2004 Montréal World Film Festival – Grand Prix des Amériques: Human Touch

References

External links

 Paul Cox: "An interview with Paul Cox, director of Innocence: 'Filmmakers have a duty to speak out against the injustices in the world'", World Socialist Web Site, 6 January 2001,
 Raven Evans, "'I Can Respect The Stupidity Of People Who Think That Speed Is Beauty,' Agrees Paul Cox", 19 May 2009.
  Richard Phillips, "'Cinema must have a social conscience' — Veteran filmmaker Paul Cox discusses his latest feature", World Socialist Web Site, 16 November 2015.
 Paul Cox: "Fight the good fight", Paul Cox's Opening Night Speech of BBFF2015 
 Richard Phillips, "'Cinema has the potential to make us richer in spirit'—filmmaker Paul Cox (1940–2016)", World Socialist Web Site, 11 July 2016.

1940 births
2016 deaths
Dutch emigrants to Australia
Dutch people of German descent
Australian people of German descent
Dutch photographers
English-language film directors
Film directors from Melbourne
People from Venlo
Liver transplant recipients
Australian art teachers
Photography academics
Photographers from Melbourne